Bloodlust may refer to:

Homicidal ideation
Human hematophagy
 Bloodlust!, a 1961 thriller film
 Bloodlust, the home video title of the 1981 film Docteur Jekyll et les femmes
 Bloodlust (1992 film), a 1992 Australian vampire film
 Bloodlust: Subspecies III, a 1994 horror film
 Bloodlust (Through the Eyes of the Dead album), 2005
 Bloodlust (Body Count album), 2017
 Vampire Hunter D: Bloodlust, a 2000 Japanese animated film
 "Bloodlust" (Supernatural), an episode of the television series Supernatural

See also
 Blood (disambiguation)
 Lust (disambiguation)